Crestron Electronics (or simply Crestron) is an American privately held multinational corporation, and manufacturer and distributor of audiovisual automation and integration equipment based in Rockleigh, New Jersey. The company designs, manufactures, and distributes equipment used to control technology in commercial audiovisual environments such as meeting spaces, conference rooms, classrooms and auditoriums; Crestron equipment is also used for high-end residential audiovisual installations.

The company does not sell its products directly. It uses a network of dealers and integrators to sell products to end users. Crestron equipment can be found in universities, government buildings, churches, and healthcare facilities worldwide. Crestron has its offices in 70 countries and headquartered in Rockleigh, New Jersey.

In 2020, Creston Electronics was awarded the "Human Interface Product of the Year" for their Wireless Horizon™ Keypads at the CES 2020 Smart Home Division Mark of Excellence Awards.

References

Companies based in Bergen County, New Jersey
Rockleigh, New Jersey
Home automation companies